Lora is a village in Lesja Municipality in Innlandet county, Norway. The village is located at the confluence of the Lora river and the Gudbrandsdalslågen river. The Lordalen valley lies to the southwest of the village. The village lies midway between the village of Lesja and the village of Lesjaskog. The European route E136 highway and the Raumabanen railway line both run through the village. Lora has one gas station, a farm equipment repair shop, and two grocery stores. The area surrounding the village of Lora primarily consists of dairy and sheep farms.

The Lordalen valley starts at the village of Lora and it heads to the southwest, passing up through the seters, and into the Reinheimen National Park. Hiking over that high pass will lead into Skjåk municipality.

References

Lesja
Villages in Innlandet
Populated places on the Gudbrandsdalslågen